The Mechi River is a trans-boundary river flowing through Nepal and India. It is a tributary of the Mahananda River.

Course
The Mechi originates in the Mahabharat Range in Nepal. It flows through Nepal, forms the boundary between India and Nepal and then flows through the Indian state of Bihar to join the Mahananda in Kishanganj district.

The Mechi-Mahananda interfluve is a transitional area between the hills and the plains and exhibits a wide range of topographical variations. The rivers originating in the hills attain a braiding character and have well developed alluvial fans.

Embankments
These need remodelling to prevent floods in the Naxalbari area of Darjeeling district. There also is a need for new embankments. As the Mechi forms the international border, it was agreed at a meeting of the Nepal-India Joint Standing Technical Committee to take due care in aligning the embankments so that they would be at identified distance from the border and the top levels of the embankments should be kept same on both sides, as far as practicable.

River linking
There is a proposal to link the Mechi to the  Kosi. Kosi–Mechi interlinking is part of a NPR 56000 billion River Interlinking Project proposed to Nepal by India. The Kankai forms part of this project.

See also
List of rivers of Nepal

References

Rivers of West Bengal
Rivers of Bihar
International rivers of Asia
Rivers of Koshi Province
Rivers of India